Warning:  This article is all goofed up.
Xyris laxifolia is a New World species of flowering plants in the yellow-eyed-grass family. It is widespread in North America, South America and Mesoamerica.

Xyris laxifolia is a perennial herb up to 90 cm (3 feet) tall with grass-like leaves up to 70 cm (28 inches) long and 25 mm (1 inch) wide.

References

External links
Photo of herbarium specimen at Missouri Botanical Garden, collected in 1987 in State of Paraná in Brazil
Photo of herbarium specimen at Missouri Botanical Garden, collected in Alabama in 1980

laxiflora
Plants described in 1874
Flora of the Southeastern United States
Flora of South America
Flora of Central America
Flora of Texas
Taxa named by Ferdinand von Mueller